The EUROSCI Network is an international academic network that promotes university co-operation through educational technology. Following a series of seminars co-funded by Erasmus+ at the University of A Coruña in Spain starting in 2011, the network was formally established on 1 September 2016. It brings together individual academics and educational institutions such as universities and business schools. The major focus is on international co-operation, teacher training, online presence management, sponsorship brokerage, and quality assurance. Eurosci has organised conferences, teacher training courses, language courses, and several editions of an EU-funded open online course of European integration. It has also promoted outreach activities at other educational levels, such as secondary school.

Institutional partners 
The Network is underpinned by institutional partners distributed across different countries of Europe, Africa and South America:

References 
 

Educational websites
Higher education organisations based in Europe
International scientific organizations
International educational organizations
University associations and consortia